Moshat is an unincorporated community in Cherokee County, Alabama, United States.

History
A post office called Moshat was established in 1884, and remained in operation until it was discontinued in 1903. The Moshat family paid the community a visit and it was decided to name the place after them.

References

Unincorporated communities in Cherokee County, Alabama
Unincorporated communities in Alabama